Daring Club Virunga  is a Congolese football club based in Goma, North Kivu province and currently playing in the Linafoot Ligue 2, the second level of the Congolese football.

History
DC Virunga was founded in 1964.

Ground
The club plays its home games at 10,000 capacity Stade de l'Unité in Goma.

Honours
Coupe du Congo
 Runner-up (1): 2008
Nord-Kivu Provincial League (LIFNOKI)
 Winners (3): 2006, 2008, 2010

References

External links
Club profile - Soccerway.com

Football clubs in the Democratic Republic of the Congo
Goma
Sports clubs in the Democratic Republic of the Congo